Orange Township is one of twelve townships in Rush County, Indiana. As of the 2010 census, its population was 796 and it contained 299 housing units.

History
The Forsythe Covered Bridge, James F. Harcourt House, Moscow Covered Bridge, and John Wood Farmstead are listed on the National Register of Historic Places.

Geography
According to the 1566

Unincorporated towns
 Gowdy at 
 Moscow at 

(This list is based on USGS data and may include former settlements.)

References

External links
 Indiana Township Association
 United Township Association of Indiana

Townships in Rush County, Indiana
Townships in Indiana